A  is a Japanese pagoda, so called because it originally contained the . A Chinese variant of the Indian stūpa, it was originally conceived as a cenotaph of the King of Wuyue – Qian Liu.

Structure and function 
Usually made in stone and occasionally metal or wood, hōkyōintō started to be made in their present form during the Kamakura period. The tōshin is the most important part of the hōkyōintō and is carved with a Sanskrit letter. The sōrin has the same shape as the tip of a five-storied pagoda. The kasa can also be called , or roof. Different structures exist, and the hōkyōintō property of the Yatsushiro Municipal Museum in Kyushu for example is divided in just four parts, with no kaeribanaza.

The sūtra contain all the pious deeds of a Tathagata Buddha, and the faithful believe that praying in front of a hōkyōintō their sins will be canceled, during their lives they will be protected from disasters and after death they will go to heaven.

The hōkyōintō tradition in Japan is old and is believed to have begun during the Asuka period (550–710 CE). They used to be made of wood and started to be made in stone only during the Kamakura period. It is also during this period that they started to be used also as tombstones and cenotaphs.

Gallery

Notes

References 

 Iwanami  Japanese dictionary Sixth Edition, DVD Version 
 Shinkō no Katachi - Hōkyōintō, Yatsushiro Municipal Museum, accessed on September 18, 2008 
 

Cemeteries in Japan
Buddhism in Japan